Sushila Shankar Adivarekar (née Desai) was an Indian politician.She was a member of the Rajya Sabha ,the upper house  of the Parliament of India 
representing Maharashtra  as a member of the Indian National Congress.

References

1923 births
2012 deaths
Rajya Sabha members from Maharashtra
Indian National Congress politicians from Maharashtra